Mirzad Mehanović (born 5 January 1993) is a Bosnian professional footballer who plays as a midfielder.

Career
Mehanović made his Fortuna Liga debut for Podbrezová against Trenčín on 25 July 2015.

In August 2017, he signed with Fastav Zlín. In the summer of 2018, Mehanović was loaned out to Ordabasy in Kazakhstan, where he played until the end of 2019. The deal between him and Ordabasy was made permanent in February 2020.

On 12 July 2021, Mehanović left Ordabasy, signing a three-year contract with Bosnian Premier League club Tuzla City on 21 July.

On 21 August 2022, Mehanović joined Saudi First Division side Al-Shoulla.

References

External links

Eurofotbal profile

1993 births
Living people
People from Srebrenica
Association football midfielders
Bosnia and Herzegovina footballers
FK Mladá Boleslav players
FK Kolín players
FK Železiarne Podbrezová players
FK Varnsdorf players
FK Jablonec players
FC Fastav Zlín players
FC Ordabasy players
FK Tuzla City players
Al-Shoulla FC players
Czech First League players
Slovak Super Liga players
Czech National Football League players
Kazakhstan Premier League players
Premier League of Bosnia and Herzegovina players
Saudi First Division League players
Bosnia and Herzegovina expatriate footballers
Expatriate footballers in the Czech Republic
Bosnia and Herzegovina expatriate sportspeople in the Czech Republic
Expatriate footballers in Slovakia
Bosnia and Herzegovina expatriate sportspeople in Slovakia
Expatriate footballers in Kazakhstan
Bosnia and Herzegovina expatriate sportspeople in Kazakhstan
Expatriate footballers in Saudi Arabia
Bosnia and Herzegovina expatriate sportspeople in Saudi Arabia